The 2007 All-Africa Games football – Men's tournament was the 9th edition of the African Games men's football tournament for men. The football tournament was held in Algiers, Algeria between 10–23 July 2007 as part of the 2007 All-Africa Games. The tournament was age-restricted and open to men's under-23 national teams.

Qualification

The following eight teams qualified for the final tournament.

Squads

Final tournament
All times given as local time (UTC+1)

Group stage

Group A

Group B

Knockout stage

Bracket

Semifinals

Third-place match

Final

Final ranking

See also
Football at the 2007 All-Africa Games – Women's tournament

References

External links
2007 All-Africa Games – Men's tournament - rsssf.com

Tournament